The Tibetan diaspora are the diaspora of Tibetan people living outside Tibet.

Tibetan emigration has three separate stages. The first stage was in 1959 following the 14th Dalai Lama's defection to Dharamshala in Himachal Pradesh, India. The second stage occurred in the 1980s, when China partially opened Tibet to foreigners. The third stage began in 1996 and continues today although with less frequency. There is considerable social tension between first and second wave refugees, referred to as 'Shichak Tibetans' and third wave refugees referred to as 'Sanjor Tibetans'. The label 'Sanjor' is deemed a pejorative by the newcomer Tibetans. Robbie Barnet, professor at the University of London speculates that Baimadaiji Angwang case in USA, an ethnic Tibetan born in Tibet, might worsen the situation of mutual distrust between the two social groups, potentially a barrier to the unity of the Tibetan diaspora.

Not all emigration from Tibet is permanent; some parents in Tibet sent their children to the communities in the diaspora to receive a traditional Tibetan Buddhist education. The 2009 census registered about 128,000 Tibetans in exile, with the most numerous part of the community living in India, Nepal and Bhutan. However, in 2005 and 2009 there were estimates of up to 150,000 living in exile.

Origins and numbers
The Central Tibetan Administration (CTA) provides a Green Book - a kind of Tibetan identity certificate - to Tibetan refugees. Based on a CTA survey from 2009, 127,935 Tibetans were registered in the diaspora: in India 94,203; in Nepal 13,514; in Bhutan 1,298; and in rest of the world 18,920. However, their number is estimated at up to 150,000, as mentioned by both Edward J. Mills et al. in 2005 and by the 14th Dalai Lama in 2009.

The larger of the other communities are in the United States, Canada (e.g. Toronto), the United Kingdom, Switzerland, Norway, France, Taiwan and Australia.

First wave
During the 1959 Tibetan uprising, the 14th Dalai Lama and some of his government fled to India. From 1959 to 1960, about 80,000 Tibetans followed the Dalai Lama to India through the Himalayas. Continued flights, estimated in the numbers of 1,000 to 2,500 a year, increased these numbers to 100,000. The movement of refugees during this time is sometimes referred to as an "exodus", as in a United Nations General Assembly resolution in 1961 that asserted that the presence of Tibetan refugees in neighboring countries was "evidence" of rights abuses in Tibet.

Second wave
After the opening of Tibet in the 1980s to trade and tourism, a second wave of Tibetan exodus took place due to increasing political repression. From 1986 to 1996, 25,000 Tibetans joined and increased by 18% their exiled community in India. This movement of refugees during this second wave is sometimes referred to as a "second exodus".

According to a US cable put out by WikiLeaks founder Julian Assange, from 1980 to November 2009, 87,096 Tibetans arrived in India and registered at the Dharamsala reception center, whereas 46,620 returned to Tibet after a pilgrimage in India. Most of those staying are children to attend Tibetan Children's Villages school.

Third and ongoing wave: Sanjorwa era

A large number of Tibetan refugees made their way into India in the 1990s after a long hiatus since 1979, and these new migrants earned the epithet ' Sanjor' or newcomer due to their fresh arrival status. A 2008 documentary directed by Richard Martini claimed that 3,000–4,500 Tibetans arrive at Dharamshala every year. Most new immigrants are children who are sent to Tibetan cultural schools. Many political activists, including monks, have also crossed over through Nepal to India. Significant cultural gaps exist between recent Tibetan emigrants (or "newcomer") and Indian-born Tibetans. The more established Tibetans in diaspora reject Tibetans from Tibet who recently defected Tibet, and who watch Chinese movies, sing Chinese music, and can speak Mandarin, are also well settled in the Tibetan community. The Dalai Lama encourages to learn multiple languages and can speak many languages himself.

Prejudicial attitude against third-wave Tibetan immigrants from 1959 immigrants exists in Tibetan diaspora world. Newcomers (post-1990s arrivals)  are referred to as 'Sanjor' by the settled Tibetans, and face social discrimination in Tibetan settlements. The social relationship is tense, and inter-marriages are rare. Strong sense of tribalism exists between various emigre groups which has resulted in physical aggressions between monasteries in south India and first-wave immigrants in the region.

In India

Organizations
The main organisation of the Tibetan diaspora is the Central Tibetan Administration of the 14th Dalai Lama based in the McLeod Ganj suburb of the city of Dharamsala in India. The CTA maintains Tibet Offices in 10 countries. These act as de facto embassies of the CTA offices of culture and information and effectively provide a kind of consular help to Tibetans. They are based in New Delhi, India; New York, USA; Geneva, Switzerland; Tokyo, Japan; London, UK; Canberra, Australia; Paris, France; Moscow, Russia; Pretoria, South Africa; and Taipei, Taiwan. The Tibetan diaspora NGOs deal with the cultural and social life of the diaspora, the preservation of cultural heritage, and the promotion of political Tibetan independence.

The first Tibetan non-governmental human rights organization to be established in exile in India was the Tibetan Centre for Human Rights and Democracy. TCHRD investigates and reports on human rights issues in Tibet and among Tibetan minorities throughout China.

Education
The Central Tibetan School Administration with a seat in New Delhi is an autonomous organization established in 1961 with the objective to establish, manage and assist schools in India for the education of Tibetan children living in India while preserving and promoting their culture and heritage. According to information on its own website, as of 2009 the Administration was running 71 schools in the areas of concentration of Tibetan population, with about 10,000 students on the roll from pre-primary to class XII, and with 554 teaching staff. According to the information on the website of the CTA, as of 2009.01.13. there were 28 CTSA schools whose enrollment was 9,991 students.

In 2009, The Tibetan Children's Villages established the first Tibetan higher college in exile in Bangalore (India) which was named "The Dalai Lama Institute for Higher Education". The goals of this college are to teach Tibetan language and Tibetan culture, as well as science, the arts, counseling and information technology.

Migration from settlements in India
Migration of young people from Tibetan settlements in India is a serious cause of concern as it threatens Tibetan identity and culture in exile with marginalization. According to Tenzin Lekshay, most exile settlements are guarded by old aged people, some established schools in the settlements are on the verge of closing for lack of pupils, and graduates are scattering to Indian cities because of the lack of employment opportunities in the community.

According to Nawang Thogmed, a CTA official, the most oft-cited problems for newly migrating Tibetans in India are the language barrier, their dislike for Indian food, and the warm climate, which makes Tibetan clothing uncomfortable. Some exiles also fear that their Tibetan culture is being diluted in India.

In Bhutan
Few Tibetans settled in Bhutan after 1959, as the country was used mainly as a transit route to India. However, in 1961, following growing tensions between China and India, India sealed its northern border with Bhutan, prompting Bhutan to arrange an emergency meeting with the Government of India (GOI) and the CTA to deal with the Tibetans stuck in the country. The government of Bhutan agreed to take in 4000 settlers, although ordinary Bhutanese became increasingly resentful of the Tibetan immigrants because of their refusal to assimilate into Bhutanese culture. In 1974, 28 Tibetans, including the representative of the 14th Dalai Lama in Thimphu, were arrested and accused of a conspiracy to assassinate King Jigme Singye Wangchuck. When the CTA refused to provide evidence of their innocence, relations between Bhutan and Dharamshala soured, and in 1979, the Government of Bhutan announced that any Tibetan in the country that did not take Bhutanese citizenship would be repatriated back to China. Despite the CTA's opposition, 2300 Tibetans applied for the Bhutanese citizenship; most of the remainder re-settled in India.

See also 

 History of Tibet
 Tibet (1912–1951)
 History of Tibet (1950–present)
 1959 Tibetan uprising
 Tibetan sovereignty debate
 Sinicization of Tibet
 Monument to the Peaceful Liberation of Tibet
 Sino-Tibetan War (1930–1932)
 Incorporation of Xinjiang into the People's Republic of China
 List of military occupations

References

Further reading

External links 

 UN General Assembly Resolution 1723 (XVI) of 1961 on the question of Tibet